Endgame, Endgames, End Game, End Games, or similar variations may refer to:

Film
 The End of the Game (1919 film)
 The End of the Game (1975 film), short documentary U.S. film
 Endgame (1983 film), 1983 Italian post-apocalyptic film
 Endgame (1999 film), short film about chess
 End Game (2006 film), 2006 political thriller
 Endgame (2007 film), an Alex Jones film, subtitled "Blueprint for Global Enslavement"
 Endgame (2009 film), 2009 British film about the end of apartheid in South Africa
 Endgame (2015 film), 2015 American film starring Rico Rodriguez
 End Game (2018 film), a 2018 Oscar-nominated documentary short film about terminally ill patients in San Francisco
 Endgame (2021 film), a 2021 Chinese-Hong Kong action black comedy film
 Avengers: Endgame, the fourth film in the Avengers series, released in 2019
 Dead Rising: Endgame, a 2016 horror film
 Highlander: Endgame, the fourth film in the Highlander series, released in 2000

Television
 End game, a synonym for "bonus round" in a television game show
 Endgame (TV series), 2011 Showcase television series
 "Endgame", a second-season episode of Alias
 "Endgame", the series finale of Alienators: Evolution Continues
 "Endgame" (Babylon 5), a fourth season episode of Babylon 5
 "Endgame", the three-part series finale of Beast Machines
 "End Game", an episode of Dinosaur Revolution
 "Endgame", the two-part series finale of Generator Rex
 "End Game" (Homicide: Life on the Street), a third season episode of Homicide: Life on the Street
 "Endgame" (Kyle XY), the first season finale of Kyle XY
 "Endgame" (Law & Order: Criminal Intent), the sixth season finale of Law & Order: Criminal Intent
 "The Endgame Syndrome", the two-part series finale of Men in Black: The Series
 "Endgame", a seventh season episode of NCIS
 "Endgame", the fourth season premiere of NCIS: Los Angeles
 "Endgame" (Person of Interest), a third-season episode of Person of Interest
 "Endgame" (Star Trek: Voyager), the two-hour series finale of Star Trek: Voyager
 "Endgame" (Stargate SG-1), an eighth season episode of Stargate SG-1 
 "Endgame" (The Unit), a fourth season episode of The Unit
 "End Game" (The X-Files), a second season episode of The X-Files
 "Endgame", the two-part "finale" of Transformers: Animated
 "Endgame", the second season finale of Young Justice which was cancelled for six years before a third season came along.
"Endgame", the two-part finale of Generator Rex
 "Endgame" (The Legend of Korra), the season one finale of The Legend of Korra
 "Endgame", a fourth season episode of Xena: Warrior Princess
 "Endgame", the season finale episode of the third season of Scream
 The Endgame, 2022 NBC television series

Games
 Endgame (video gaming), extended gameplay for which players return after completing the core game objectives
 Endgame, the final mission of Call Of Duty: Modern Warfare 2
 Endgame:  Proving Ground, a mobile phone augmented reality game
 End Game, the final expansion pack for the video game, Battlefield 3
 Endgame (video game), a shooting video game for PlayStation 2
 Endgame: Singularity, a 2005 video game
 Chess endgame, the stage of a chess game when there are few pieces left on the board
 Endplay, the stage of the play of the cards when there are few cards left in each hand 
 The gameplay available in mostly massively multiplayer online role-playing games for characters that have completed/nearly completed their level progression
 Endgame: Syria, a 2012 newsgame
End Game: Union Multiplayer,  a 2022 multiplayer shooter game, created to raise funds for the overthrow of the military dictatorship in Myanmar

Literature
 The End of the Game (1986 collection) anthology by Sheri S. Tepper in the series The True Game
 The Endgame: The Inside Story of the Struggle for Iraq, from George W. Bush to Barack Obama, by Michael R. Gordon and Bernard E. Trainor
 Endgame (play), a 1957 play by Samuel Beckett
 Endgame (anthology), an anthology of short fiction in the Merovingen Nights science fiction series
 Endgame (Jensen books), a two-volume work written by Derrick Jensen
 Endgame (Doctor Who), a Doctor Who novel
 Endgame: The Blueprint for Victory in the War on Terror, a non-fiction book by Thomas McInerney and Paul E. Vallely
 Clone Wars Volume 9: Endgame, the ninth in a series of trade paperbacks entitled Clone Wars
 Endgame, the second part of the 2013 novelization of the first book of the animated TV series The Legend of Korra
 Endgame: The Spectacular Rise and Fall of Bobby Fischer, a non-fiction book by Frank Brady on chess champion Bobby Fischer
 End Games, a 2007 crime novel by Michael Dibdin
 Endgame: The Calling, a novel by James Frey
 Batman: Endgame, a comic book story arc featuring the Joker
 "End-Game", a short story by British sci-fi author J.G Ballard in the collection The Terminal Beach
 End Game: Tipping Point for Planet Earth, a 2015 non-fiction book by Anthony Barnosky and Elizabeth Hadly
 Endgame, the sixth and final Noughts and Crosses (novel series) book by Malorie Blackman

Music 
 Endgames (band), new wave/funk group from Scotland
 Endgame (opera), 2018 opera based on Beckett's play, by György Kurtág

Albums
 The End of the Game, a 1970 album by British blues rock musician Peter Green
 Endgame (Megadeth album), a 2009 album by Megadeth; also the album's title track
 Endgame (Rise Against album), a 2011 album by Rise Against; also the album's title track
 Endgame Tour, a concert tour by Rise Against in support of the above album
 Endgame (Blood of the Martyrs EP), a 2016 extended play by Blood of the Martyrs

Songs
 "End Game" (song), a track on the 2017 Taylor Swift album Reputation
 "Endgame", a track on the 1991 R.E.M. album Out of Time
 "Endgames", a track on the 1999 Godflesh album Us and Them
 "End Game", a track on the 1983 Ian Anderson album Walk into Light
 "End Game", a track on the 1969 Lalo Schifrin album Mannix
 "Endgame", a track on the 2019 Angel Olsen album All Mirrors

Other uses
 Climate endgame, an hypothesis of global societal collapse due to effects of climate change
 End Game, a term in BitTorrent vocabulary concerning its method for obtaining the final few pieces of a file
 Endgame, Inc., a company that provides computer vulnerability research
 Operation Endgame, a plan by the U.S. Department of Homeland Security

See also

 End (disambiguation)
 Game (disambiguation)